The 2017 Asian Girls' U18 Volleyball Championship was the second edition of the Asian Girls' U18 Volleyball Championship, a biennial international volleyball tournament organised by the Asian Volleyball Confederation (AVC) with Chinese Volleyball Association (CVA). It was held in Chongqing, China from 5 to 13 March 2017. The tournament served as the Asian qualifiers for the 2017 FIVB Volleyball Girls' U18 World Championship held in Argentina with the top four ranked teams qualifying for the world championship.

The matches was played in only one stadium in Chongqing: Chongqing No.8 Secondary School Gymnasium. It was the second time that China and the first time that Chongqing had hosted the tournament. As hosts, China automatically participated for the tournament, while the remaining 10 teams (with the withdrawn of Kazakhstan). 

Japan won the tournament with a 3–0 final win over China. Both finalists and the semifinalist, South Korea and Thailand qualified for the World Championship.

Participated teams

Pools composition
The teams were seeded based on their final ranking at the 2014 Asian Girls' U17 Volleyball Championship. The host country and the top 7 ranked teams were seed in the Serpentine system. The 7 remaining teams were drawn in Bangkok, Thailand

Ranking from the previous edition was shown in brackets except the host (who ranked 3rd) and the teams who did not participate, which were denoted by (-). 

Kazakhstan withdraw after the draw.

Pool standing procedure
 Number of matches won
 Match points
 Sets ratio
 Points ratio
 If the tie continues as per the point ratio between two teams, the priority will be given to the team which won the last match between them. When the tie in points ratio is between three or more teams, a new classification of these teams in the terms of points 1, 2 and 3 will be made taking into consideration only the matches in which they were opposed to each other.
Match won 3–0 or 3–1: 3 match points for the winner, 0 match points for the loser
Match won 3–2: 2 match points for the winner, 1 match point for the loser

Preliminary round
All times are China Standard Time (UTC+08:00)

Pool A

|}

|}

Pool B

|}

|}

Pool C

|}

|}

Pool D

|}

|}

Second round
The results and the points of the matches between the same teams that were already played during the preliminary round shall be taken into account for the classification round.
All times are China Standard Time (UTC+08:00)

Pool E

|}

|}

Pool F

|}

|}

9-11th place

|}

|}

Final round

Quarterfinals

|}

5th–8th semifinals

|}

Semifinals

|}

7th place

|}

5th place

|}

3rd place

|}

Final

|}

Final standing

Awards

Most Valuable Player
  Yuki Nishikawa
Best Outside Hitters
  Park Hye-min
  Yuki Nishikawa
Best Setter
  Zhang Zihan

Best Middle Blockers
  Mao Junyi
  Lee Ju-ah
Best Libero
  Mizusugi Rena
Best Opposite
  Sun Xiaoxuan

References

External links

Asian women's volleyball championships
Asian
V
V
Asian Girls' U17 Volleyball Championship